Sabine Fouchaux (born 2 October 1988) is a Lebanese recording artist and actress.

Early life
Sabine was born in Saudi Arabia to a French father and a Lebanese mother.

Discography 

  Ba'etli Email 
  Bes'al Hali
  Be'tethir Menak
  Barkouli Ya Banat
  Talikni
  Ana ayouni Bihebouk
  Yoh Yoh
  akher hammak
  beyni w beynak ya hal leil
  Ya Khsara
  Mamnoua yezaal
  Ouyouni Bi Hebbouk 
  Stop
  Albi bari2 
  lesh za3lana
  bashhad ana leek

Albums 
 Stop

TV series 
 Ahmad and Kristina
 Fakhamat al chak

Awards 

 "Universal Studio"
 "BBC Radio" 
 "Murex D'or"

References 

1988 births
Living people
21st-century Lebanese women singers
Lebanese pop singers
Lebanese Christians
Lebanese people of French descent